Electro swing, or swing house, is an electronic dance music genre that combines the influence of vintage or modern swing and jazz mixed with house and hip hop. Successful examples of the genre create a modern and dance-floor focused sound that is more readily accessible to the modern ear, but that also retains the energetic excitement of live brass and early swing recordings. Electro swing groups typically include singers, musicians playing traditional jazz instruments (e.g. trumpet, trombone, clarinet, saxophone) and at least one DJ.

Notable artists
 AronChupa
 Boogie Belgique
 Caravan Palace
 Caro Emerald
 Chinese Man
 Deluxe
 Dimie Cat
 Parov Stelar
 Tape Five
 Yolanda Be Cool

Chart performances of notable releases
 "I'm an Albatraoz" by the Swedish DJ AronChupa has been certified seven-times platinum in Sweden, quadruple platinum in Canada, triple platinum in Italy, and double platinum in Australia.
 Robot Face (stylized <°_°>) by French band Caravan Palace placed at No. 3 on the Billboard US Top Dance/Electronic Albums chart in 2015.
 "We No Speak Americano" by Australian musicians Yolanda Be Cool and DCUP was a major hit in Australia and Europe, and achieved considerable success in the United States on the Billboard Hot 100.
Other notable songs include "Doop" by Doop (UK No. 1), "A Little Party Never Killed Nobody (All We Got)" by Fergie, Q-Tip and GoonRock (US platinum), "Bang Bang" by will.i.am (UK platinum), "Emergency" by Icona Pop (US Dance No. 1),  and "Bboom Bboom" by Momoland (South Korea platinum).

References

External links

 Sampling the Swing Era: The Role and Function Vintage Music Plays Within the Genre of Electro Swing, Chris Inglis 2015
 The rise of Electro Swing: Why the sounds of the '30s and '40s are re-emerging in popular music, Chris Inglis 2014

 
Electronic dance music genres